KISA-LD, virtual channel 40 (UHF digital channel 22), is a low-powered QVC-affiliated television station licensed to San Antonio, Texas, United States. The station is owned by HC2 Holdings.

History
On January 22, 1992, the FCC granted a construction permit to San Antonio College to build a new station to broadcast on UHF channel 48, and assigned the call sign K48DS. Signing on in January 1994, the station broadcast educational programming. The FCC allocated channel 48 for ABC affiliate KSAT-TV (channel 12)'s digital operations in April 1997, and San Antonio College tried to move the station to channel 46, but were denied permission to do so. By April 2002, KSAT-DT signed on, and K48DS was forced to shut down. Unable to operate the station on its licensed frequency, and in need of funds for construction, the college sold the station to Mako Communications on August 17, 2004. The new owners relocated the station to channel 40 in March 2005 under the call sign K40IH, then changed the call sign to KISA-LP seven months later.

On May 18, 2006, the station became a charter affiliate of LAT TV, a Spanish-language network that focused on family and educational programming. At the time, KISA-LP did not have cable television carriage, and so, was quite limited in its ability to reach the population of San Antonio, but eventually, the station was able to secure cable television carriage on Grande Communications, but it was a lack of cable carriage that finally forced LAT TV to cease operations on May 20, 2008.

On May 24, 2012, the station changed its call sign to KISA-LD.

In June 2013, KISA-LD was slated to be sold to Landover 5 LLC as part of a larger deal involving 51 other low-power television stations; the sale fell through in June 2016. Mako Communications sold its stations, including KISA-LD, to HC2 Holdings in 2017.

Digital channels
The station's digital signal is multiplexed:

References

External links
LAT TV Official site (English)
LAT TV Official site (Español)

Television stations in Texas
Low-power television stations in the United States
Innovate Corp.